Pedro P. Romualdo (June 29, 1935 – April 24, 2013) was a Filipino politician. He was elected to five terms as a Member of the House of Representatives of the Philippines, representing the Lone District of Camiguin from 1987 to 1998, and from 2007 to his death in 2013. Between his congressional terms, Romualdo was elected governor of Camiguin, serving from 1998 to 2007. At his death he was a member of the  Nationalist People's Coalition.

References

 

1935 births
2013 deaths
Governors of Camiguin
Lakas–CMD (1991) politicians
Lakas–CMD politicians
Members of the House of Representatives of the Philippines from Camiguin
20th-century Filipino lawyers
People from Camiguin
Deaths from pneumonia in the Philippines
Recipients of the Presidential Medal of Merit (Philippines)